Torsten Ivan Lindqvist (2 December 1925 – 3 November 2002) was a Swedish modern pentathlete who competed in the 1952 Summer Olympics. He finished ninth individually and won a silver medal with the Swedish team. At the world championships he won team gold medals in 1951 and 1953 and an individual bronze in 1951.

After retiring from competitions Lindqvist became an internationally renowned nuclear physicist.

References

1925 births
2002 deaths
Swedish male modern pentathletes
Olympic modern pentathletes of Sweden
Modern pentathletes at the 1952 Summer Olympics
Olympic silver medalists for Sweden
Olympic medalists in modern pentathlon
World Modern Pentathlon Championships medalists
Medalists at the 1952 Summer Olympics